Kielder Observatory is an astronomical observatory located in Kielder Forest, Northumberland, England. It is situated high upon Black Fell overlooking Kielder Water near the Scottish border, and half a mile up a forest track from James Turrell's Kielder Skyspace. The site was chosen due to its pristine night skies in a location free of light pollution with clear views to all horizons, and is one of the best places in the UK to view the Milky Way.

The observatory's design is the result of a competition managed by RIBA Competitions which was won by London-based Charles Barclay Architects. The building is powered by solar panels and a wind turbine. It won the RIBA Award for its architecture in 2009 and also that same year a Civic Trust Award.

The observatory is administered by the Kielder Observatory Astronomical Society, a registered charity comprising a board of Trustees and 10 permanent members of educational delivery staff. They are responsible for the delivery of the event schedule and coordinating a large group of volunteers who assist in running the public events that are hosted at the facility.

History

Kielder Forest was a popular place for stargazing before the construction of the observatory, with the Kielder Forest Star Camp being an annual event there. Amateur astronomer Gary Fildes, who had been involved with the Star Camp, began advocating for an observatory to be built within the forest, leading a campaign that eventually raised several hundred thousand pounds in order to pay for construction. Kielder Observatory was officially opened on 25 April 2008 by Sir Arnold Wolfendale, the 14th Astronomer Royal, and in its first year entertained approximately 1200 guests with numbers growing "astronomically" in 2014 nearing 20,000 visitors, thus making it one of the top tourist destinations in Northumberland.

In 2018, Kielder Observatory expanded to accommodate construction of the Gillian Dickinson Astroimaging Academy.

Kielder Observatory also runs educational outreach activities in schools throughout the region via a project co-funded by various local authorities. In 2019, Kielder Observatory was awarded funding and contract for delivery in the North of Tyne Combined Authority district.

In 2021, Kielder Observatory constructed a new telescope, a  Radio2Space Radio Antenna, donated by the Tanlaw Foundation. This project is intended to educate the general public on Radio Astronomy  and assist teaching programmes in schools.

Staff
The science communication team at the observatory consists of a mixture of practical / observational astronomers and astrophysicists.

Dan Pye - Director of Astronomy and Science Communication
Daniel Monk - Director of the Gillian Dickinson Astro-imaging Academy
Eleanor Macdonald - Science Lead
Adam Shore - Education Lead

Awards
 Northumberland What's On Where Award 2015 - Best Visitor Attraction
 North East Tourism Awards 2014 - Small Visitor Attraction (Silver Award)
 Visit England Gold Award 2013 - Kielder Water Forest Park

See also
 List of observatories

References

External links

 
 Kielder Observatory on Twitter
 Trip Advisor reviews
 Civic Trust Award Page on the Observatory
 Kielder Forest Star Camp
 Kielder Observatory listing on Go Stargazing

Buildings and structures in Northumberland
Amateur astronomy organizations
Astronomical observatories in England
Infrastructure completed in 2008
Tourist attractions in Northumberland
Recipients of Civic Trust Awards